The 2012 BB&T Atlanta Open was a professional men's tennis tournament played on hard courts. It was the 25th edition of the tournament which was part of the 2012 ATP World Tour. It took place at Atlantic Station in Atlanta, United States between July 16 and July 22, 2012. It was the men's first event of the 2012 US Open Series. Fourth-seeded Andy Roddick won the singles title.

Singles main-draw entrants

Seeds

 1 Rankings are as of July 9, 2012

Other entrants
The following players received wildcards into the singles main draw:
  Brian Baker
  Steve Johnson
  Jack Sock

The following players received entry as a special exempt into the singles main draw:
  Rajeev Ram

The following players received entry from the qualifying draw:
  Ruben Bemelmans
  Ričardas Berankis
  Sergei Bubka
  Alex Kuznetsov

Withdrawals
  Lukáš Lacko

Retirements
  Mardy Fish (right ankle injury)

Doubles main-draw entrants

Seeds

 Rankings are as of July 9, 2012

Other entrants
The following pairs received wildcards into the doubles main draw:
  Steve Johnson /  Jack Sock
  Kevin King /  Ignacio Taboada

Withdrawals
  Alex Bogomolov Jr. (shoulder injury)

Finals

Singles

 Andy Roddick defeated  Gilles Müller, 1–6, 7–6(2), 6–2

Doubles

 Matthew Ebden /  Ryan Harrison defeated  Xavier Malisse /  Michael Russell, 6–3, 3–6, [10–6]

References

External links
Official website

BBandT Atlanta Open
Atlanta Open (tennis)
BBandT Atlanta Open
BBandT Atlanta Open
2012 in Atlanta
Tennis tournaments in Georgia (U.S. state)